Quest University (officially Quest University Canada) is a private, not-for-profit, secular liberal arts and sciences university.  The university opened in September 2007 with an inaugural class of 73. The university has an enrolment of around 200 students as of around 2022.

Quest's curriculum is considered unconventional. It uses the block plan, adapted and modified from the block plan at Colorado College. Students must complete 32 blocks to graduate. Classes are seminar-style and are capped at 20 students. There are five divisions (Life Sciences, Physical Sciences, Arts & Humanities, Mathematics, and Social Sciences) instead of traditional departments. In lieu of declaring a major, students write a personalized Question. Studies culminate in a major work called a Keystone project. Upon graduation—usually after four years study—students are awarded a degree of Bachelor of Arts and Sciences. 

The campus is located on a  hilltop on the edge of Garibaldi Provincial Park.
Quest University Canada is fully accredited and approved by the Degree Quality Assessment Board (DQAB) under the British Columbia Ministry of Advanced Education. Quest is also registered as a British Columbia Education Quality Assurance (EQA) approved post-secondary institution.

On February 23, 2023, the university announced that it would suspend operations at the end of the 2022–2023 academic year.

History

Pre-founding and founding
Quest University Canada was originally created as the Sea to Sky University in May 2002, when the Legislative Assembly of British Columbia passed the Sea to Sky University Act. One of the purposes cited in the act was to create a university that would "offer a rigorous and well-rounded university education in the arts and sciences with a global focus." Quest is the brainchild of David Strangway, who, after his retirement as president of the University of British Columbia, wished to create a new kind of university where undergraduates guided their own studies in close cooperation with faculty.

Together with Quest founding directors Blake Bromley and Peter Ufford, Strangway formed the Sea to Sky Foundation and began soliciting contributions and searching for land. The foundation received grants from the J.W. McConnell Foundation, R. Howard Webster Foundation, and the Stewart and Marilyn Blusson Foundation, which allowed it to begin hiring staff and faculty and launch the university's operations. Bromley, a lawyer specializing in charitable law, recruited many wealthy clients to donate shares to the foundation, many of which were sold back to donors after a charitable tax receipt had been issued, a move that triggered an investigation from the Canada Revenue Agency. In October 2005, the Sea to Sky University changed its name to Quest University Canada. The school officially opened its doors to students in 2007, becoming the first private, secular university in Canada.

Early years
During its first years of operation, the university underwent a number of administrative changes. David Strangway stepped aside as president and was replaced by Thomas L. Wood, who had served for 14 years as president of Mount Royal College and three years as Quest's Chief Academic Officer. Less than a year later, Wood was replaced by an interim president, Dean Duperron. Duperron's appointment was the result of a proposed alliance with CIBT Education Group, but the alliance was dissolved within a month.

The Board of Governors invited David Helfand, chair of the astronomy department at Columbia University, to serve as interim president. Helfand had been an advisor to the school's founders in 2005, and had been a visiting tutor since 2007. He became interim president in 2008. In 2011, Quest graduated its first class. That same year, Helfand took a long-term leave of absence from Columbia to continue the presidency at Quest, which he retained through August 2015.

Peter Englert succeeded Helfand. He served until 8 May 2017 when he was removed by the university's Board of Governors. George Iwama was appointed as Quest's Vice-Chancellor and fifth President on 25 August 2017. In September 2017 Quest named its newest chancellor, Peter Webster, president of the R. Howard Webster Foundation. In February 2018 the University cancelled its athletics program, the Quest Kermodes, citing the need to cut costs to reduce its high debt load.

On October 29, 2020, Quest University announced that an agreement had been signed with Primacorp Ventures, an investment company which owns and manages commercial and educational real estate. Under the agreement, Quest will sell their campus lands to Primacorp and then lease them back in order to continue operations.

Academics
Quest's curriculum and educational philosophy are different than most universities. Its approach is multidisciplinary and the school does not have traditional departments. It offers one degree for all students, the Bachelor of Arts and Sciences. There are no lecture halls. Every class has a maximum of 20 students. The faculty hold terminal degrees in their field, but are known as Tutors rather than Professors. There is no tenure system at Quest.

Other distinguishing features include the Foundation and Concentration Programs, block plan scheduling, a Question instead of a conventional major, and a final Keystone project.

Foundation program
In their first two years of study, students enroll in 16 Foundation courses. After completing the mandatory Cornerstone and Rhetoric classes, they go on to take 14 courses chosen from five major divisions: Social Sciences, Life Sciences, Physical Sciences, Mathematics, and Arts & Humanities. They must also fulfil a language requirement.

Toward the end of the Foundation Program, students take a course called Question. Working with an instructor and a faculty mentor, they develop a statement of Question: a proposal for how they will study a topic of particular interest to them. The Question is in lieu of a conventional major, serves as the basis for the remaining two years of study, and inspires the student's Keystone project.

Concentration program
The remaining two years are known as the Concentration Program. With the help of a faculty advisor, students design a personalized program, which consists of four principal elements:
 a statement of the Question
 a course plan
 a list of related readings
 a Keystone project

Along with their Concentration (or Focus) Courses, students take between one and four Experiential Learning Blocks, hands-on work that can take place in the private sector, not-for-profit, government or many other settings. Quest states that the purpose of Experiential Learning is to show students how their interests manifest in the world and help them gain direct experience. Students also take three or more electives.

Block plan
Quest operates on the block plan, where students take one course at a time, meeting every weekday for 3.5 weeks. The academic year is divided into two terms. Fall term usually runs from September to mid-December, and spring term typically runs from January to the end of April. There are four blocks per term, and full-time students take eight blocks per year.

Quest claims that the block plan allows scheduling flexibility: students can decide which blocks are spent on courses and which are spent traveling, working, or exploring other pursuits. The school also notes that block scheduling permits faculty to run "field studies", off-campus learning experiences that can run for several weeks. Many field studies involve fees, which range from nominal to significant. Quest also offers Study Abroad. Students can spend one or two academic terms at a selection of partner universities around the world.

Keystone
To graduate, students must complete a Keystone project, the culmination of their studies. A Keystone can take various forms: a scientific paper, video documentary, art installation, photography exhibit, work of fiction, or research paper. Students present their Keystones to their peers, faculty and community. A few outstanding Keystones are granted Distinction, and some are chosen as Showcases that the students present to a wide audience in a formal setting. The university provides ample services to prepare students to justify, to Graduate school admissions officers, their Keystone as the equivalent to a major.

Rankings and reputation
Quest University Canada has historically posted at or near the top of Canada's foremost poll of student opinion, the National Survey of Student Engagement (NSSE).

Quest is not included in Macleans University Rankings because its enrollment is below 1000 students, the magazine's cut-off. However, Macleans conducted an interview with then-President David Helfand in 2013 and has published several articles about the school over the years. Quest has also been noted in The Globe and Mail's University Report.

Leadership
George Iwama is the current president of Quest University Canada. The Chancellor is Peter W. Webster, chairman of the R. Howard Webster Foundation. The Quest Board of Governors currently consists of seven members, headed by Board Chair Arthur Wilms, former president of Westcoast Energy Inc. In 2018, Anna Lippman became the first Quest alumnus elected to the board. Jeff Warren, an arts and humanities professor, is currently the Vice President, Academic.

Campus

The campus has been named one of top 10 most beautiful campuses in Canada. It is built on  a hilltop in Squamish, BC.

Quest's campus includes an academic building, a library building, a "RecPlex" which contains a full gymnasium facility, and a services building that includes a cafeteria. There are currently five main student residences, each priced the same as an average Canadian university and with nearly twice the floor space. Currently only two are being used by the university students. The others have been rented out to a high school which uses the Campus daily.

Cost and financial aid
Because Quest is private, it receives no government funding at any level. Its operations are funded by tuition and private donations. According to its website, full-time tuition for Canadian students and permanent residents is C$21,000. For international students, it is $35,000. Room and board can add another $15,000, depending on the student's selections.

Eligible students can receive financial aid, including scholarships that range from $2000 to full tuition; bursaries; and a Work-Study program on campus. Quest also offers substantial scholarships through its LEAP program (see below). Quest is an approved post-secondary institution to administer government student loans from all provinces in Canada plus the Northwest Territories, Nunavut and the Yukon. Quest is also an approved post-secondary institution to administer certain programs out of the US.

Leaders in Elite Athletics and Performance program
Quest's Leaders in Elite Athletics & Performance program (LEAP) is structured to accommodate the needs of elite athletes and performers who wish to pursue a postsecondary education. LEAP students are afforded extra flexibility in housing, billing, and course scheduling. They may take more years to graduate, and are eligible for LEAP scholarships.

Notable LEAP students and alumni include:
 Jack Burke (professional road cyclist for Team H&R Block)
 Samuel Edney (luger; Olympian)  
 Darren Gardner (snowboarder; Olympian)
 Rosalind Groenwoud (freestyle skier; Olympian, Winter X Games Champion)
 Keltie Hansen (freestyle skier; Olympian)
 Leah Kirchmann (professional road cyclist for Team Sunweb; Olympian)
 Simon Nessman (international model)

Notable faculty members 
 David Strangway (geophysicist; founding president of Quest University Canada; President Emeritus at the University of Toronto and University of British Columbia)
 David Helfand (astrophysicist; former Chair of the Department of Astronomy at Columbia University and co-director of the Columbia Astrophysics Laboratory; former President Emeritus of Quest University Canada)
 Glen Van Brummelen (mathematics scholar; past President of the Canadian Society for History and Philosophy of Mathematics)
 Richard Hoshino (mathematics professor; winner of the 2017 Adrien Pouliot Award for Significant and Sustained Contributions to Mathematics Education in Canada; former coach for Canadians competing in the International Mathematical Olympiad)

See also
List of universities in British Columbia
Higher education in British Columbia

Notes

References

External links
 

Universities in British Columbia
Educational institutions established in 2002
Sea-to-Sky Corridor
2002 establishments in British Columbia
Private universities and colleges in Canada